The DeltaPlex Arena & Conference Center (formerly Grand Rapids Stadium, Stadium Arena) was a 5,500-seat multipurpose arena in Walker, Michigan, United States. It was the home of the Grand Rapids Gold of the NBA G League and the Grand Rapids Wanderers of the Major Arena Soccer League 3. Built in 1952 as The Stadium Arena, the facility was purchased and renovated in the 1990s and opened its doors as The DeltaPlex Arena & Conference Center in 1998. The value hosted many sporting events, political events, national touring concerts, and expos. The arena is a  space, which has a  ceiling, accommodate up to 8,000 for concerts. The DeltaPlex was purchased by the Visser Brothers Inc   and officially closed its doors July 2022.

History
The original building was constructed in 1952, and began life as the Stadium Arena. The building had an arched roof design with wooded arch supports instead of steel.  The building housed many different tenants including two defunct IHL Hockey teams. The Grand Rapids Rockets in the 1950s (an NAHL team of the same name played in the building during the 1990s) and the Grand Rapids Owls in the late 1970s until 1980. During the 1960s and early 1970s it was home to Atlantic Mills Department Store.  It was also home for a short time to a drive-in theater, known as the Stadium Drive-In Theater. For most of its life it was located at the corner of Turner Ave. and West River Drive.  However, due to a reconstruction of West River Drive, the parking lot was enlarged and Turner Ave. ended at West River Drive.

It was the Grand Rapids area's main indoor entertainment facility until the opening of Van Andel Arena in 1996.  In the mid-1990s the building was sold to the Langlois Family. After the purchase an extensive, ground-up restoration and remodeling regimen followed and the newly christened DeltaPlex was born.

The arena served as the Grand Rapids chapter of Arena Racing. It also previously hosted the Grand Rapids Flight of the International Basketball League in 2008. In 2010, the DeltaPlex Arena was home to the West Michigan ThunderHawks of the Indoor Football League.

The DeltaPlex was the home of the Denver Nuggets' NBA G League affiliate, the Grand Rapids Gold.

On April 27, 2022 it was announced that the DeltaPlex Arena would close permanently on July 31, 2022.

References

External links
 Official Site

Basketball venues in Michigan
Buildings and structures in Kent County, Michigan
Convention centers in Michigan
Grand Rapids Drive
Grand Rapids Gold
Indoor arenas in Michigan
Defunct NBA G League venues
Sports venues in Michigan
Sports venues completed in 1952
Tourist attractions in Kent County, Michigan
1952 establishments in Michigan
Indoor ice hockey venues in Michigan
Indoor soccer venues in Michigan
Continental Basketball Association venues